Samuel LaWayne Haddix (born July 23, 1965) is a former American football defensive back who played in the National Football League (NFL) for the New York Giants (1987–1988), Tampa Bay Buccaneers (1990–1991), and Cincinnati Bengals (1991). Haddix was selected to the Pro Bowl in 1990 after intercepting his only seven interceptions of his career.   He attended college at Liberty University.

Haddix lettered in football, basketball and baseball at Middleton High School in Middleton, Tennessee.

References

1965 births
Living people
American football cornerbacks
Cincinnati Bengals players
Liberty Flames football players
National Conference Pro Bowl players
New York Giants players
Tampa Bay Buccaneers players
People from Bolivar, Tennessee
Players of American football from Tennessee